Louis Apollinaire Christien Emmanuel Comte "The King's Conjurer" (born Geneva, June 22, 1788 – Rueil, November 25, 1859), also known simply as Comte, was a celebrated nineteenth-century Parisian magician, greatly admired by Robert-Houdin.

He performed for Louis XVIII at the Tuileries Palace and was made a Chevalier de la Légion d'Honneur by Louis-Philippe. He was sometimes called "The Conjurer of the Three Kings" (Louis XVIII, Charles X, and Louis-Philippe). In 1814, Comte became the first conjurer on record to pull a white rabbit out of a top hat though this is also attributed to the much later John Henry Anderson.

Comte owned the Théâtre Comte passage des Panoramas of the 2nd arrondissement of Paris and another one in the Passage Choiseul.

Bibliography 
 Milbourne Christopher, David Copperfield, The Illustrated History of Magic, 2005, p. 133. .
 Henry Ridgely Evans, The Old and the New Magic, Chicago, 1906. Reprinted 2006, . p. 150ff.
 Paul Courville, Magic Tokens 2020, p. 32-33,   @ www.magictoken.org

References

French magicians
People from Geneva
1788 births
1859 deaths